Ashna Roy (born 14 March 1997) is an Indian badminton player.

Achievements

BWF International Challenge/Series 
Women's doubles

  BWF International Challenge tournament
  BWF International Series tournament
  BWF Future Series tournament

References

External links 
 

1997 births
Living people
Indian female badminton players
20th-century Indian women
21st-century Indian women